Madame Rouge is a supervillain appearing in American comic books published by DC Comics, first appearing in Doom Patrol #86 (March 1964). The character was created by Arnold Drake.

Michelle Gomez portrays the live-action version of the character starting in the third season of the HBO Max series Doom Patrol.

Fictional character biography
Laura De Mille was originally a French stage actress. After an automobile accident, she developed a dual good/evil split personality. At this point, she attracted the notice of The Brain and his associate Monsieur Mallah. With Mallah's help, the Brain performed surgery on De Mille that was, from his perspective, successful, sublimating her good personality and allowing her evil personality to remain dominant. As Madame Rouge, De Mille became the only female member of the Brotherhood of Evil, and assisted the Brotherhood in its continuing conflicts against the Doom Patrol. At first, Madame Rouge was simply a master of disguise; subsequent surgery by the Brain eventually gave her the ability to alter her appearance and stretch her limbs.

Later, Rouge's split personality manifested again, with her good personality occasionally appearing. Rouge was romantically linked to the Doom Patrol's leader, Niles Caulder ("The Chief"), who was able to help Rouge overcome her evil side and ally with the Doom Patrol.

Ultimately, Rouge's mind reverted to its evil state, causing her to seek vengeance against both the Brotherhood of Evil and the Doom Patrol for their previous interference. She was apparently successful in murdering both groups. Years later, Robotman and the Teen Titans tracked down Rouge and her ally, General Zahl. Beast Boy (then Changeling) killed Rouge, although at the moment of her death, her good side apparently manifested; she forgave Changeling and called to Niles, her apparent true love.

Madame Rouge's daughter, Gemini, also a shapeshifter, appeared years later to seek revenge against Beast Boy.

In 2004, DC writer John Byrne restarted the Doom Patrol series and declared that the previous history had never happened. In spite of this, Madame Rouge was a zombie summoned by Brother Blood to keep the Titans from freeing Kid Eternity in Teen Titans (vol. 3) #31 (2006). Since then, Byrne's reboot of the Doom Patrol franchise was overturned as a continuity glitch created by Superboy-Prime. As such, Madame Rouge is still dead and her history has been left intact. However, her daughter Gemini has taken up wearing her mother's costume and is a member of the new Brotherhood of Evil.

In Blackest Night, Madame Rouge has been identified as one of the deceased entombed below the Hall of Justice. Madame Rouge's corpse is revived as a Black Lantern during the event.

Powers and abilities
Originally, Madame Rouge was a master of disguise. Later, the Brain altered Rouge's molecular structure that gave her an amorphous physiology. Now, she can stretch her whole body to incredible lengths and mimic the appearance of any person at will.

In other media

Television
 Madame Rouge appears in Teen Titans, voiced by Hynden Walch. This version is a member of the Brotherhood of Evil who sports a Russian accent and a red suit. Additionally, she possesses limited superhuman strength and the ability to reform her body to repair damage. She takes part in the Brotherhood's efforts to eliminate young heroes around the world, only to be defeated and flash-frozen by the Teen Titans.
 Madame Rouge appears in the "Doom Patrol" segment of DC Nation Shorts, voiced by Debra Wilson.
 Madame Rouge appears in the Teen Titans Go! (2013) episode "Beast Girl", voiced again by Hynden Walch.
 Madame Rouge appears in Doom Patrol, portrayed by Michelle Gomez as an adult and by Ava Grace Roberts as a child. This version is a former member of the Sisterhood of Dada who attempts to join the Brotherhood of Evil, only to be betrayed, inspired to reform, and become the leader of the Doom Patrol.

Miscellaneous
 Madame Rouge appears in Justice League Adventures #6.
 Madame Rouge appears in Justice League Unlimited #31.
 Madame Rouge appears in Teen Titans Go! (2004).

References

External links
 Madame Rouge at Comic Vine

Comics characters introduced in 1964
Doom Patrol
DC Comics female supervillains
Fictional actors
Fictional amorphous creatures
Fictional female assassins
Fictional French people
Fictional impostors
Fictional Russian people
Fictional characters who can stretch themselves
Fictional characters with dissociative identity disorder
DC Comics characters who are shapeshifters
DC Comics characters with accelerated healing
DC Comics metahumans
DC Comics titles
Characters created by Arnold Drake